The term Border cell might refer to:
Border cell (brain) of entorhinal cortex.
Border cells (Drosophila), in the ovary of the fly genus Drosophila
Cells produced by plant roots that are also known as border cells